The Reaper is a 2014 Croatian-Slovenian drama film directed by Zvonimir Jurić. It was selected to be screened in the Contemporary World Cinema section at the 2014 Toronto International Film Festival.

Cast
 Ivo Gregurević as Ivo
 Mirjana Karanovic as Mirjana
 Igor Kovac as Josip
 Nikola Ristanovski as Kreso
 Lana Baric
 Zlatko Buric as Rodic
 Dado Cosic as Dado

References

Further reading

External links
 

2014 films
2014 drama films
Croatian drama films
2010s Croatian-language films
Slovenian drama films